John Torres is an American songwriter, recording artist, and occasional actor from Los Angeles, California.

His music has been featured in popular films and television shows and has received numerous honors, including a John Lennon Songwriting Award, a nomination for an American Independent Music Award, and a short listing for Best Original Song by the Academy of Motion Picture Arts and Sciences. He has released four studio albums, as well as numerous singles and music videos.

As an actor, Torres played the lead role of Drew in the first production of the Broadway musical Rock of Ages. He also co-starred as Peter in the first major production of the musical Bare: A Pop Opera.

Discography

Albums
 There There Album (2006)
 Music After All (2009)
 Live at the NoHo Brick House (2009)
 John Torres (2013)

Notes
 "You Don't Have To Be A Star" - Oscar Short List - by: John Torres, Dale Narins and Alexander Rosenbloom
 John Lennon Songwriting Competition - John Torres "Hallelujah" Winner
 John Torres stars as Peter in "Bare: A Pop Opera"

External links
 Official Website

References

American country singers
American country songwriters
American male pop singers
American folk singers
American male songwriters
Living people
1978 births
Musicians from Los Angeles
University of California, Los Angeles alumni
People from San Dimas, California
Singers from California
21st-century American singers
Country musicians from California
21st-century American male singers